A vozhd romanized from  Belarussian, Russian and Ukrainian: вождь, also Bulgarian, Macedonian and Serbian: вожд romanized vožd, or , literally meaning  "the guidesperson" or "the leader", is a historical title with etymology deriving from the Proto-Slavic *voďь and thus common across Slavic languages. It originally denoted a chieftain of a tribe, whereas upon rise of statehood it was used thereafter also in the context of a supreme leader and/or supreme commander, in particular when both roles were combined in one person. 

History
In Serbia, that title was given to Karađorđe Petrović by all the voivodes who elected him to be their leader at their first Praviteljstvujusceg sovejeta (Government Council) during the First Serbian Uprising in the 19th century. As such Karađorđe was titled Grand Vožd of Serbia.

Later, in Russian, it was often used in reference to Soviet leaders such as Vladimir Lenin and Joseph Stalin as Vozhd of the proletariat, Vozhd of the Russian Communist Party, Vozhd of the World Revolution, Vozhd of the Peoples, Vozhd of the Soviet people.

In modern Russian, vozhd became exclusive for Communist leaders or leaders of aboriginal tribes. The word is becoming somewhat obsolete and is being replaced by its English version, "leader". It is a counterpart to the word Führer in German.

After the East German cinema studio DEFA began mass-producing Red Western movies depicting the "Wild West" in the 18th and 19th centuries, the term vozhd became closely associated with tribal chiefs of Native Americans (such as Vozhd Beloye Pero, i. e. Chief White Feather.)

Vozhd also has connotations to "master" in the Russian language, from the days of serfdom.

See also 
 Tsar

References

External links
 Vozhdi CCCP at Savok.org

First Serbian Uprising
Joseph Stalin
Vladimir Lenin
Leaders of the Soviet Union
Russian words and phrases
Honorary titles